The Shire of Capel is a local government area in the South West region of Western Australia, taking in the land between the cities of Bunbury and Busselton about  south of the state capital, Perth.

The Shire of Capel has 29 km of beach frontage onto Geographe Bay including access at Forrest Beach, Peppermint Grove Beach, Minninup Beach and Dalyellup Beach. The eight kilometer stretch of Stirling Beach (commencing at the Capel River, north to the Minninup Beach access at Rich Road) has no public access points since all the adjacent land is privately owned.

According to the 2016 census figures, the population of the Shire of Capel was 17,123.

History

Capel was initially constituted as the first Bunbury Road District on 15 June 1894 (as distinguished from the Bunbury Municipal District). On 26 July 1907, it was renamed to the Capel Road District, and on 1 July 1961, it became a shire under the Local Government Act 1960.

Wards
The Shire is no longer divided into wards and the nine councillors sit at large.

Towns and localities
The towns and localities of the Shire of Capel with population and size figures based on the most recent Australian census:

(* indicates locality is only partially located within this shire)

Heritage-listed places

As of 2023, 189 places are heritage-listed in the Shire of Capel, of which eleven are on the State Register of Heritage Places.

References

External links
 

Capel